EQF may refer to:

 European Qualifications Framework, a translation device to make national qualifications more readable across Europe
 Equifax, a consumer credit reporting agency in the United States